The Siege is a fantasy novel by Troy Denning, set in the world of the Forgotten Realms, and based on the Dungeons & Dragons role-playing game. It is the second novel in the "Return of the Archwizards" series. It was published in paperback in December 2001.

Plot summary
Evereska defends itself against the phaerimm, as the Chosen of Mystra fight for their goddess against the Shadovar and the long-exiled Netherese archwizards try to consolidate their foothold in the Prime Material plane.
 
Meanwhile, the elf Galaeron Nihmedu fights his own shadow for possession of his very being.

Reception

References

2001 American novels
Forgotten Realms novels